Barry Prime (born 15 July 1954) is a British former swimmer. He competed in two events at the 1972 Summer Olympics.

References

External links
 

1954 births
Living people
British male swimmers
Olympic swimmers of Great Britain
Swimmers at the 1972 Summer Olympics
Place of birth missing (living people)
Australian Institute of Sport coaches
20th-century British people